Abbeyleix House, sometimes called Abbeyleix Castle, is an Irish country house that was the residence of the Viscounts de Vesci in County Laois, Ireland. It was designed by architect James Wyatt and built by Sir William Chambers in 1773. The de Vesci family lived at Abbeyleix House until it was sold in the mid-1990s. Abbeyleix is the oldest planned estate town in Ireland.

History
The house was near the original Abbeyleix, that was built by the O'Mores near the River Nore where there was a Cistercian Monastery, founded in 1183. On the dissolution of the monasteries,  of land were granted to the 10th Earl of Ormond. In 1675, Denny Muschamp, a wealthy landowner, bought the old abbey lands, these were inherited in 1699 by his daughter, who married Sir Thomas Vesey, 1st Baronet, who moved to Abbeyleix when he was created a baronet. In 1770, their grandson Thomas Vesey, 2nd Baron Knapton – later, in 1776, created Viscount de Vesci – commissioned the English architect James Wyatt to build him a new house in an elevated position. The area was prone to flooding and de Vesci, wishing to improve the view from his new mansion, relocated the dwellings of his estate workers and tenants to a new site farther east on higher ground alongside the coach road, as a planned estate town, with the estate and mansion  to the southwest of the town.

Recently owned and restored by the businessman Sir David Davies, Abbey Leix House and estate was placed on the market in 2019, continuing into 2020, for a region of €20 million. In June 2021, John Collison purchased the estate for a sum in the region of the advertised €11.5 million.

The property
The large rectangular, three-storey house, with 117 windows, is considered to be one of the finest in Ireland. The property includes  of grounds, including walled gardens and farmland, and ten estate houses and cottages.

References

External links
 1773 – Abbeyleix House, Abbeyleix, Co. Laois

Buildings and structures in County Laois
Houses completed in 1773
Georgian architecture in Ireland